Timothy Spillane (1842 – December 3, 1901) was an Irish-born soldier who fought for the Union Army during the American Civil War. He received the Medal of Honor for valor.

Biography
Spillane received the Medal of Honor on September 16, 1880, for his actions at the Battle of Hatcher's Run from February 5–7, 1865 while with Company C of the 16th Pennsylvania Cavalry.

Medal of Honor citation

Citation:

The President of the United States of America, in the name of Congress, takes pleasure in presenting the Medal of Honor to Private Timothy Spillane, United States Army, for extraordinary heroism on February 5–7, 1865, while serving with Company C, 16th Pennsylvania Cavalry, in action at Hatcher's Run, Virginia, for gallantry and good conduct in action; bravery in a charge and reluctance to leave the field after being twice wounded."

See also

List of American Civil War Medal of Honor recipients: Q-S

References

External links

1842 births
1901 deaths
Union Army soldiers
United States Army Medal of Honor recipients
American Civil War recipients of the Medal of Honor
Irish-born Medal of Honor recipients
People from County Kerry